Kalachevsky is a rural locality (a khutor) and the administrative center of Kalachyovskoye Rural Settlement, Kikvidzensky District, Volgograd Oblast, Russia. The population was 675 as of 2010. There are 14 streets.

Geography 
Kalachevsky is located on Khopyorsko-Buzulukskaya plain, on the Karman River, 27 km southwest of Preobrazhenskaya (the district's administrative centre) by road. Kuzkin is the nearest rural locality.

References 

Rural localities in Kikvidzensky District